West Hills Community College District (WHC) is a public community college district in California serving students in the San Joaquin Valley. Colleges in the district include West Hills College Coalinga and West Hills College Lemoore. The original campus in Coalinga was established in 1932, and the Lemoore campus was built in 2002. In addition, there is a center at Firebaugh and classes are offered at Lemoore Naval Air Station.

West Hills College Coalinga is one of the 11 California community colleges that have dormitories and attracts students from around the world. WHC actively recruits students from other countries. In addition, classes from California State University, Fresno are videoconferenced at the Lemoore campus and Fresno Pacific University offers two bachelor's degree programs on the campus of West Hills College Lemoore.

Both campuses offer sports programs.  West Hills College Coalinga offers football, baseball and basketball for men and volleyball and softball for women.  A top-ranked rodeo team that competes against two and four year schools is coed. West Hills College Lemoore offers soccer, golf and cross country for men and women, basketball for women, and wrestling for men. Other sports programs are being added.

Both West Hills College Coalinga and West Hills College Lemoore are accredited by the Accrediting Commission for Community and Junior Colleges.

References

External links
 Official webpage.

California Community Colleges
Universities and colleges in Kings County, California
Universities and colleges in Fresno County, California
Coalinga, California
Educational institutions established in 1932
Schools accredited by the Western Association of Schools and Colleges
1932 establishments in California